The scaled flowerpiercer (Diglossa duidae) is a species of bird in the family Thraupidae. It is found in the tepuis of Brazil and Venezuela.

Its natural habitats are subtropical or tropical moist montane forests and subtropical or tropical high-altitude shrubland.

References

scaled flowerpiercer
Birds of the Tepuis
scaled flowerpiercer
Taxonomy articles created by Polbot